Tom Axel Grambusch (born 4 August 1995) is a German field hockey player who plays as a defender for Rot-Weiss Köln and the Germany national team.

He represented his country at the 2016 Summer Olympics, where he won the bronze medal.

He was educated at Seaford College.

References

External links
 
 
 
 
 

1995 births
Living people
People educated at Seaford College
Sportspeople from Mönchengladbach
German male field hockey players
Male field hockey defenders
Field hockey players at the 2016 Summer Olympics
2018 Men's Hockey World Cup players
Olympic field hockey players of Germany
Olympic bronze medalists for Germany
Olympic medalists in field hockey
Medalists at the 2016 Summer Olympics
Rot-Weiss Köln players
2023 Men's FIH Hockey World Cup players
21st-century German people